John Kent (c. 1612 – will proven 1669), of the Market Place, Devizes, Wiltshire, was an English politician.

He was a Member (MP) of the Parliament of England for Devizes from 1661 to August 1669.

References

1612 births
1669 deaths
People from Devizes
English MPs 1661–1679